Saaremaa Rally is a rally competition which annually takes place in Saare County, Estonia.

First competition was held in 1974.

Winners

 1974 Toonart Rääsk - Urmas Silm
 1975 Valter Hännikainen - Meinhart Paas (in category: sport rally); Hillar Salumäe - Tiit Vähi (in category: folk rally)

References

External links
 

Rally competitions in Estonia
Annual sporting events in Estonia
Recurring sporting events established in 1974
Saaremaa